Kirill Goratsiyevich Gevorgian  (born 8 April 1953) is a Russian jurist and diplomat. From 2003 to 2009, he served as Russia's ambassador to the Netherlands. In 2014, he was elected to the International Court of Justice for a term beginning the following year.

On 8 February 2021, Gevorgian was elected Vice President of the Court, succeeding Xue Hanqin.

In March 2022, during the dispute between Russia and Ukraine on allegations of genocide (Ukraine v. Russian Federation), Gevorgian voted against the adoption of provisional measures which ordered Russia to cease its special operation in Ukraine, as he believed the Court had no jurisdiction over the case. Nonetheless, the measure was adopted by thirteen votes to two, with Chinese jurist Xue Hanqin casting the other dissenting vote. This conclusion notwithstanding, he voted in favour of the measure requesting the Parties not to aggravate their dispute since, as he declared, "the power to indicate such measure is a power inherent to the Court".

References

External links
Curriculum Vitae (page 50)

1953 births
Living people
Russian people of Armenian descent
Lawyers from Moscow
Diplomats from Moscow
Ambassador Extraordinary and Plenipotentiary (Russian Federation)
Ambassadors of Russia to the Netherlands
International Law Commission officials
International Court of Justice judges
Russian judges of United Nations courts and tribunals